The 1959 United States Grand Prix was a Formula One motor race held on December 12, 1959, at Sebring International Raceway in Sebring, Florida. It was the last of 9 races in the 1959 World Championship of Drivers and the 8th and final in the 1959 International Cup for Formula One Manufacturers.It was the second United States Grand Prix (ninth including the American Grand Prize races from 1908–16), and the only occasion the race was held at the home of the 12 Hours of Sebring endurance sports car race, the Sebring International Raceway in Florida. The race was held over 42 laps of the 8.36-kilometre circuit for a total race distance of 351 kilometres.

The race was won by New Zealander Bruce McLaren driving a Cooper T51 for the works Cooper team, the first win for a New Zealand-born driver. McLaren won by six-tenths of a second over French driver Maurice Trintignant driving a Rob Walker Racing Team-entered Cooper T51. British driver Tony Brooks finished third in his Ferrari Dino 246. Championship points leader Australian Jack Brabham ran out of fuel on the last lap and pushed his Cooper T51 across the line to finish fourth. Brooks's third-place finish clinched the title for Brabham. It was the first of three world championships for Brabham, and the first for an Australian, for Cooper, and for a rear-engined car.

McLaren's win at 22 years, 3 months and 12 days saw him became the youngest-ever Grand Prix winner, a record that would stand for over 40 years. However, he was not the youngest to win a World Championship race. That record was held by American driver Troy Ruttman who had won the 1952 Indianapolis 500 when aged 22 years, 2 months and 19 days. The Indianapolis 500 was included as a round of the World Championship between 1950 and 1960, but it was not considered a Grand Prix.

This was the last race until the 1994 Monaco Grand Prix that no former world champions were in the field. This was also the last race where a bonus point for fastest lap would be awarded until the 2019 Australian Grand Prix.

Background
For the first time since 1951, three drivers were in contention for the title going into the final race. A win would seal it for Brabham, or just finishing in front of Stirling Moss and Brooks. Moss needed to finish first or second and ahead of Brabham, while for Brooks winning would not necessarily be enough.
 Brabham (31 points) needed either
 First
 Second, with Moss behind him
 Third with fastest lap and Moss second or lower
 Brooks second or lower and Moss third or lower
 Moss (25.5 points) needed either
 First
 Second with Brabham behind him, and Brooks first without fastest lap or lower
 Second with fastest lap, with Brabham behind him
Brooks (23 points) needed either
 First with fastest lap and Brabham third or lower
 First, with Moss second without fastest lap or lower and Brabham third or lower

Summary
Russian-born Alec Ulmann's dream of an American Grand Prix was realized in December, 1959 when 19 entries, including six American drivers, arrived in Florida for the final World Championship event of the season. Originally scheduled as the year's opening round, the now season-concluding Sebring race saw the Championship down to Cooper versus Ferrari. Australian Jack Brabham led for Cooper with 31 points to 25.5 for Stirling Moss, also in a Cooper, and 23 for Ferrari driver Tony Brooks.

The field featured works Coopers for Brabham and 22-year-old Bruce McLaren of New Zealand; blue Rob Walker-entered Coopers for Moss and Frenchman Maurice Trintignant; four Ferraris — three in Italian red for Englishmen Brooks and Cliff Allison, and German Wolfgang von Trips; one in American white and blue for Phil Hill; front-engined Lotuses for Innes Ireland and Alan Stacey; and, incomprehensibly for the European road-racing elite, the number 1 Kurtis-Offy midget of USAC National Champion Rodger Ward, the only American-built and American-driven entry.

Ward's car had an underpowered engine (1.7 liters to 2.5 for the F1 cars), separate gear-change levers for the two-speed gearbox and two-speed rear end, and an outboard handbrake. Ward explained how his participation in the race came about by saying, "Ullman called me up and invited me to race in the Grand Prix. He offered me some money, and I was in the habit of accepting money, so I told him I'd bring the midget."

Qualifying ended with Moss, Brabham and Brooks on the front row, but, overnight, American Harry Schell was given third position, next to Moss and Brabham. The 3:05.2 lap that got Schell on the front row apparently had come at the tail end of the session, and had gone unnoticed by almost everyone; his best time previously had been 3:11.2, good enough for 11th.

Protests ensued from nearly every other team, most vociferously Ferrari, whose man, Brooks, was displaced on the front row. The shouting match raged even as "The Star-Spangled Banner" was being sung, but when it was through, Schell started from third place.

What had really happened with Schell did not come out until after the race. At Sebring, just beyond the MG bridge and before the esses was a sharp right turn that apparently led nowhere. Schell found, however, that it connected with the end of the Warehouse Straight, bypassing the entire straight and the Warehouse Hairpin. He had secretly cut across and come back on the course during a lull in the traffic – and cut six seconds off his time! It didn't help him in the race, however; he was eighth after the first lap and retired after only six.

Moss led the race from the start and built a gap of ten seconds over Brabham, but after only five laps he retired with a broken gearbox. Already out of the running for the title was Brooks, who had been bumped off the front row by Schell's qualifying ruse. Brooks was rammed from behind by teammate von Trips in the first turn, and pitted to examine the damage. The stop cost him two minutes, and proved to be unnecessary. Though he rejoined to drive a sensational race and finish third, he never had a realistic shot at Brabham.

Brabham took the lead from Moss while his teammate McLaren followed in second for most of the race. Midway through, with half the field out due to mechanical problems, Brabham slowed to allow McLaren to close up to him, and Trintignant's Rob Walker Cooper began taking huge bites off their lead, as his pit crew kept him informed of his position.

As the last lap began, Trintignant was only four seconds behind the two leaders. On the long airport straight, two turns from the finish, Brabham's car began to sputter, and it rolled to a halt 400 yards from the line on the uphill front straight, out of gas. He had refused to follow Team Manager Cooper's exhortations to start the race on full tanks, hoping instead to find more speed from a lighter car. McLaren, surprised to see Brabham slowing, lifted his foot and slowed as well. Brabham waved him on frantically, and McLaren resumed speed just soon enough to hold his lead through the last turn and cross the line less than a second ahead of Trintignant, who had set the race's fastest lap only three laps from the end. This would be the last Grand Prix in which Formula One awarded a point for the fastest lap until the 2019 Australian Grand Prix 60 years later.

Brabham was also passed by Brooks for third place, but the final three cars still running were several laps behind. The rules required that he finish without assistance, so he got out and pushed his car up the hill to finish fourth and earn his first World Drivers' Championship, the first for an Australian driver. Cooper also claimed its first Constructors' Championship, the first for a rear-engined car. Brooks's third place gave Ferrari second place in the Constructors' Championship; Innes Ireland was fifth, three laps down in his Lotus, and Wolfgang von Trips ended up sixth after his Ferrari's engine gave way with four laps to go. With his victory, McLaren became the youngest ever Grand Prix winner at age 22 years, 104 days. In addition to his prize money, he also won several acres of land adjoining Sebring Lake.

Despite the exciting finish of the race and the championship, however, the United States Grand Prix at Sebring was a financial disaster. The crowd was half the size of that year's 12 Hours of Sebring sports car race, and after distributing the $15,000 purse, including a huge $6,000 winner's share, Alec Ulmann just about broke even. The next year, he would try again, on the opposite coast, in Riverside, California.

Classification

Qualifying

Race 

Notes
 – Includes 1 point for fastest lap

Championship standings after the race

Drivers' Championship standings

Constructors' Championship standings

 Notes: Only the top five positions are included for both sets of standings. Only the best 5 results counted towards each championship. Numbers without parentheses are championship points; numbers in parentheses are total points scored.

References

External links
 
 
 
 

United States Grand Prix
United States Grand Prix
United States Grand Prix
United States Grand Prix
United States Grand Prix
Sebring, Florida